Achmer Airport  is a regional airport located  southwest of Bramsche, a town in the district of Osnabrück in Lower Saxony, Germany. It supports general aviation with no commercial airline service scheduled.

History
During World War II, the airport was used by the German Luftwaffe and after their withdrawal also by British Royal Air Force as Advanced Landing Ground B-110 Achmer.

Facilities
It has a grass runway designated 07/25 which measures .

See also

 Transport in Germany
 List of airports in Germany

References

External links
  Flugplatz Achmer / Osnabrücker Verein für Luftfahrt e.V.
 

Achmer
Buildings and structures in Osnabrück (district)